Double Wedding may refer to:
 Double Wedding (1937 film), an American romantic comedy film
 Double Wedding (1933 film), a British comedy film
 Double Wedding (2010 film), an American television film
 Double wedding